Gerald Wellesley, 7th Duke of Wellington,  (21 August 1885 – 4 January 1972), styled Lord Gerald Wellesley between 1900 and 1943, was an Anglo-Irish diplomat, soldier, and architect.

Background and education
Wellesley was the third son of Lord Arthur Wellesley (later 4th Duke of Wellington) and Lady Arthur Wellesley (later Duchess of Wellington, née Kathleen Bulkeley Williams). He was baptised at St Jude's Church of Ireland parish church, Kilmainham, Dublin, on 27 September 1885. He was educated at Eton.

Career
Wellesley served as a diplomat in the Diplomatic Corps in 1908. He held the office of Third Secretary of the Diplomatic Service between 1910–17, and the office of Second Secretary of the Diplomatic Service between 1917–19. He was invested as a Fellow of the Royal Institute of British Architects in 1921, and as a Fellow of the Royal Society of Arts in 1935, and was Surveyor of the King's Works of Art, 1936–43. He gained the rank of Lieutenant-Colonel in 1939 in the service of the Grenadier Guards. He fought in the Second World War between 1939 and 1945. As a somewhat elderly officer with a spinsterish manner, he earned the nickname 'The Iron Duchess.

But Simon Heffer, Editor of Chips Channon's diaries Volume 3 in 2022 records that it was applied by Army colleagues as he was gay. His diplomatic skills proved invaluable in dealing with the Allies.

In 1943, he succeeded his nephew, Henry, as Duke of Wellington, Earl of Mornington, and Prince of Waterloo. His nephew's other title, Duke of Ciudad Rodrigo, passed to Henry's sister (his niece) Lady Anne Rhys, before she ceded it to him in 1949. He served as Lord Lieutenant of the County of London between 1944–49 and as Lord Lieutenant of Hampshire between 1949-60. In 1951, he was made a Knight of the Garter.

Architecture projects
Among his architecture projects was the remodelling of 5 Belgrave Square, the London home of Henry "Chips" Channon, an Anglo-American member of Parliament, and of Channon's country house, Kelvedon Hall in Essex. Working with Trenwith Wills, Wellesley also remodeled Castle Hill, Filleigh, in Devon; Hinton Ampner in Hampshire; and Biddick Hall in County Durham and St Mary and St George Church in High Wycombe. Wellesley also designed the Faringdon Folly tower for Lord Berners and built Portland House in Weymouth in 1935.

Books
He was the author of the following books :
The Iconography of the First Duke of Wellington (1935)
The Diary of a Desert Journey (1938)
The Journal of Mrs. Arbuthnot (1950)
A Selection from the Private Correspondence of the First Duke of Wellington (1952)

Wellington Museum
In 1947 the Duke gave Apsley House and its important contents (Wellington Collection) to the nation with Wellington Museum Act''' (but retained the right to occupy a large portion for him and his family)

Family
Wellesley was bisexual or homosexual, but married Dorothy Violet Ashton (30 July 1889 – 11 July 1956) on 30 April 1914. The marriage was unhappy and they separated in 1922 but never divorced. She was the daughter of Robert Ashton of Croughton, Cheshire (a second cousin of the 1st Baron Ashton of Hyde) heirs of a cotton manufacturing family and (Lucy) Cecilia Dunn-Gardner, later Countess of Scarbrough. Her stepfather from 1899 was Aldred Lumley, 10th Earl of Scarbrough. They had two children:
Valerian Wellesley, 8th Duke of Wellington (2 July 1915 – 31 December 2014)
Lady Elizabeth Wellesley (26 December 1918 – 25 November 2013)

Dorothy, a poet, became the lover of Vita Sackville-West, (who wrote her entry for the Oxford Dictionary of National Biography''). Wellesley had been engaged to Sackville-West's lover Violet Trefusis. Dorothy later became the lover and long-time companion of Hilda Matheson, a prominent BBC producer.

After his wife's death in 1956, Wellesley reportedly wished to marry his widowed sister-in-law, Lady Serena James, but she did not wish to leave her marital home. Wellesley was the maternal grandfather of the actor and musician Jeremy Clyde.

References

External links

 Duke of Wellington's Regiment – West Riding

1885 births
1972 deaths
People educated at Eton College
Gerald Wellesley, 7th Duke of Wellington
British Army personnel of World War II
Dukes of Ciudad Rodrigo
Dukes of Wellington
Dukes da Vitória
Wellesley, Gerald 7
Grenadier Guards officers
Knights of the Garter
Knights of the Order of St John
Lord-Lieutenants of Hampshire
Lord-Lieutenants of the County of London
Surveyors of the Queen's Works of Art
Princes of Waterloo
Fellows of the Royal Institute of British Architects
English LGBT politicians
LGBT peers
Chancellors of the University of Southampton
Earls of Mornington
LGBT military personnel